Jochum is a given name and surname.

Given name 
Notable people with the given name include:
Jochum Brinch Lund (1743–1807), Norwegian merchant, shipowner and industrial pioneer
Jochum de Lange, Norwegian rebel, farmer and sailor
Jochum Nicolay Müller (1775–1848), Norwegian naval officer
Jochum Johansen (1823–1913), Norwegian civil servant
Jochum ten Haaf (born 1978), Dutch actor

Surname 
Notable people with the surname include:
Betsy Jochum (born 1921), American baseball player
Charles Jochums (born 1957), Belgian racing cyclist
Eugen Jochum (1902–1987), German conductor, brother of Georg and Otto
Georg Ludwig Jochum (1909–1970), German conductor
Michael Jochum, American rock drummer
Otto Jochum (1898–1969), German composer, choral director and music educator
Pam Jochum (born 1954), American politician and President of the Iowa Senate

Surnames
Given names